The 2023 World Baseball Classic (WBC) is an international professional baseball competition, composed of 20 competing nations, held from March 8 to March 21, 2023. It will be the fifth iteration of the World Baseball Classic.  The first-round hosts cities will be Taichung, Tokyo, Phoenix, and Miami. The second-round hosts will be Miami and Tokyo, and the championship round will be played in Miami.

Twenty teams will compete in the 2023 World Baseball Classic (WBC). The tournament is being expanded from 16 to 20 teams, with all teams that participated in the 2017 edition automatically qualifying, plus four additional spots. Participating nations had to submit their final 30-man rosters no later than February 7, 2023. WBC rules required teams to carry at least 14 pitchers and two catchers on their rosters. If applicable, the club listed is the club a player is with at the start of the tournament.



Key

Pool A

Chinese Taipei announced their squad on 2023.

Manager: 70 Lin Yueh-ping

Coaches: Hitting 23 Peng Cheng-min, 91 Tseng Hao-jin, Pitching 0 Hsu Ming-chieh, First base and outfield 66 Chang Chien-ming, Third base 13 Chen Chiang-ho, Bench and catching 34 Kao Chih-kang, Bullpen 40 Wang Chien-ming

Cuba announced their squad on January 25, 2023.

Manager: 6 Armando Johnson Zaldívar

Coaches: Bench 11 Germán Mesa, Batting 46 Orestes Kindelán, Pitching 24 Jose Elosegui, 99 Pedro Luis Lazo, First base 9 Armando Ferrer, Third base 39 Rafael Muñoz, Coach 37 Humberto Guevara

Italy announced their squad on January 26, 2023.

Manager: 31 Mike Piazza

Coaches: Bench 10 Blake Butera, Pitching 58 Michael Borzello, First base and infield 4 Jack Santora, Bullpen 50 Jason Simontacchi, Outfield 34 Michele Gerali, Coach 55 Joe Hsu, Third base and hitting 13 Chris Denorfia

Netherlands announced their squad on January 23, 2023.

Manager: 31 Hensley Meulens

Coaches: Hitting Tjerk Smeets, Pitching 28 Bert Blyleven, First base Gene Kingsale, Third base 44 Ben Thijssen, Bench 25 Andruw Jones, Bullpen Mike Harkey, Quality control Evert-Jan 't Hoen

Panama announced their squad on September 28, 2022.

Manager: 21 Luis Ortiz

Coaches: Bench 8 Luis Caballero, Hitting 4 Earl Agnoly, 76 Víctor Preciado, Pitching 73 Enrique Burgos, 14 Wilfredo Córdoba, First base Cirilo Cumberbatch. Bullpen 95 Hipólito Ortiz, Third base 44 Vicente Garibaldo

Pool B

Australia announced their squad on February 10, 2023.

Manager: 14 David Nilsson

Coaches: Bench 13 Shayne Watson, Hitting 32 Chris Adamson, Assistant hitting 3 Will Bradley, Pitching 33 Jim Bennett, First base 18 Michael Collins, Third base 19 Andrew Graham, Bullpen 27 Graeme Lloyd

Japan announced their squad on January 26, 2023. Seiya Suzuki withdrew due to oblique injury on February 28, then added Taisei Makihara as a replacement member of Suzuki.

Manager: 89 Hideki Kuriyama

Coaches: Bench 90 Kazuyuki Shirai, Hitting 77 Sadaaki Yoshimura, First base 87 Masaji Shimizu, Pitching 81 Masato Yoshii, Bullpen 75 Kazuyuki Atsuzawa, Infield 79 Noriyuki Shiroishi, Catching 74 Yoshinori Murata

South Korea announced their squad on January 4, 2023.

Manager: 71 Lee Kang-chul

Coaches: Hitting 77 Kim Ki-tai, Third base 72 Kim Min-ho, First base 76 Kim Min-jae, Catching 70 Jin Kab-yong, Pitching 91 Jong Hyun-wook, Bullpen 81 Bae Young-soo, Quality control 88 Shim Jae-hak

China announced their squad on February 10, 2023.

Manager:  41 Dean Treanor

Coaches: Defensive 86 Chen Biao, Hitting and catching 56 Wang Wei, Infield 25 Chen Jiaji, Third base 16 Tarrik Brock, Baserunning 51 Zhu Xudong, Outfield 24 Chen Yanpeng, 3 Du Nan

Czech Republic announced their squad on September 13, 2022.

Manager: 13 Pavel Chadim

Coaches: Quality control Joe Truesdale, Pitching 22 John Hussey, Hitting Alex Derhak, Third base 17 David Winkler, First base Michael Griffin, Bullpen 25 Dusan Randak, Catching David Neveril

Pool C

United States announced their squad on January 18, 2023.

Manager: 4 Mark DeRosa

Coaches: Bench 11 Jerry Manuel, 34 Brian McCann, Pitching 13 Andy Pettitte, Hitting 24 Ken Griffey Jr., First base 6 Lou Collier, Third Base 14 Dino Ebel, Bullpen 19 Dave Righetti

Mexico announced their squad on February 9, 2023.

Manager: 30 Benji Gil

Coaches: Bench 9 Vinny Castilla, Hitting 18 Jacob Cruz, 70 Bobby Magallanes, Pitching 26 Horacio Ramírez, First base 12 Gil Velazquez, Third base 21 Tony Perezchica, Bullpen 45 Elmer Dessens

Colombia announced their squad on February 9, 2023.

Manager: 8 Jolbert Cabrera

Coaches: Bench 15 Jose Mosquera, Hitting 23 Jorge Cortés, Pitching 44 Walter Miranda, First base 10 Ronald Ramirez, Third base 5 Jair Fernandez, Assistant 18 Orlando Cabrera, Assistant 16 Édgar Rentería

Canada announced their squad on 2023.

Manager:  12 Ernie Whitt

Coaches: Pitching 35 Denis Boucher, Coach 8 Greg Hamilton, Third base 34 Tim Leiper, Bullpen 45 Paul Quantrill, First base 33 Larry Walker, Bullpen 22 Jordan Procyshen

Great Britain announced their squad on 2023.

Manager:  13 Drew Spencer

Coaches: First base 34 Albert Cartwright, Pitching 36 Zach Graefser, Third base 21 TS Reed, Bench 7 Brad Marcelino, 0 Antoan Richardson, Bullpen 51 Conor Brooks, Associate hitting 3 Jonathon Cramman

Pool D

Israel announced their squad on 2023.

Manager: 3 Ian Kinsler

Coaches: Hitting 20 Kevin Youkilis, Bench 12 Brad Ausmus, 48 Jerry Narron, Pitching 28 Josh Zeid, First base 5 Tyger Pederson, Third base 2 Blake Gailen, Bullpen 16 Nate Fish

Nicaragua announced their squad on 2023.

Manager: 7 Sandor Guido

Coaches: Bench 26 Julio Sanchez, Hitting 18 Luis Alen, Pitching 57 Jorge DePaula, 4 Cairo Murillo, First base 59 Jenrry Roa, Third base 2 Franklin Lopez, Batting practice 23 Yader Roa

Puerto Rico announced their squad on 2023.

Manager: 4 Yadier Molina

Coaches: Bench 73 Alex Cintrón, Hitting 23 Victor Rodriguez, Assistant hitting 19 Juan González, Pitching 27 Ricky Bones, First base 6 José Molina, Third base 2 Luis Rivera, Bullpen 50 José Rosado

Venezuela announced their squad on 2023.

Manager: 22 Omar López

Coaches: Pitching 72 Iván Arteaga, Third base 23 Ramón Borrego, Hitting 63 Rodolfo Hernández, Bench 64 Carlos Mendoza, First base 12 Rouglas Odor, Bullpen 19 Luis Ramírez, Assistant hitting 52 Wilfredo Romero

Dominican Republic announced their squad on January 18, 2023.

Manager: 10 Rodney Linares

Coaches: Bench 46 Tony Diaz, Hitting 54 Luis Ortiz, Assistant hitting 90 Frank Valdez, Pitching 68 Wellington Cepeda, Assistant pitching 45 José Canó, First base 29 Julio Borbón, Third base 39 Ramón Santiago

References

External links
Official website

World Baseball Classic 2023
Rosters